Qiaozhuang is a town under the administration of Boxing County, Shandong, China. , it administers the following 66 villages:
Qiaozhuang Village
Sanchazhong Village
Sanchadong Village
Sanchaxi Village
Xuefang Village
Gaijia Village
Xiaozhuang Village
Xinyu Village
Chenjiahuang Village
Wangwangzhuang Village
Sanhe Village
Dinggao Village
Zhangjiazhuang Village
Xinghuang Village
Liuguaizi Village
Xingwei Village
Cangshang Village
Huangjia Village
Hexu Village
Luocheli Village
Mouwang Village
Dazhuang Village
Ningjia Village
Xixiao Village
Liushanren Village
Jiaochang Village
Jiaojia Village
Dongcui Village
Xicui Village
Beijiaxu Village
Nanjiawang Village
Guanzhuang Village
Weijiazhuang Village
Liuwang Village
Zhangzhai Village
Wangzhai Village
Dongsanxin Village
Shisanzhuang Village
Baowang Village
Lianglou Village
Liugu Village
Niejia Village
Xindian Village
Liuwangzhuang Village
Yulin Village
Qianliujia Village
Wangping Village
Shouyili Village
Xisanxin Village
Tanjia Village
Dongzhangwang Village
Chengjia Village
Chengma Village
Yanmiao Village
Qihezhuang Village
Shuangtai Village
Caizhai Village
Yuhuangtang Village
Shiwanggao Village
Xinmin Village
Wangyuan Village
Qianxuchen Village
Houxuchen Village
Xifeng Village
Dongfeng Village
Beijiawang Village

References 

Township-level divisions of Shandong
Boxing County